Serhiy Yuriyovych Symonenko (born 12 June 1981) is a Ukrainian retired football defender.

Symonenko started his career in Russia with Torpedo Moscow and then Alania Vladikavkaz before joining Chornomorets Odessa in 2002. After making over 100 appearances in all competitions for Chornomorets he joined Arsenal Kyiv for the start of the 2007–08 season.

In 2004, he played for the Ukraine national team. Symonenko made his debut for Ukraine on 18 February 2004 in an away draw with Libya (1:1). He was replaced on 62nd minute by Vyacheslav Checher.

External links

Profile on soccer.ru

1981 births
Living people
People from Kupiansk
Ukrainian footballers
Ukraine youth international footballers
Ukraine international footballers
Association football defenders
FC Torpedo Moscow players
FC Torpedo-2 players
FC Spartak Vladikavkaz players
FC Arsenal Kyiv players
FC Chornomorets Odesa players
FC Chornomorets-2 Odesa players
FC Sevastopol players
FC Bunyodkor players
Ukrainian Premier League players
Russian Premier League players
Ukrainian expatriate footballers
Expatriate footballers in Russia
Expatriate footballers in Uzbekistan
Ukrainian expatriate sportspeople in Russia
Ukrainian expatriate sportspeople in Uzbekistan
Sportspeople from Kharkiv Oblast